C. Ramachandra Reddy is a politician from Bharatiya Janata Party in Telangana and he represented Khairatabad Assembly constituency.

Political career
At the age of 12 years, Reddy joined the RSS and has been an active member since then. He served as chief of Greater Hyderabad BJP and unsuccessfully contested from Khairatabad in 2009 Assembly elections.

In 2014 Telangana Assembly election he won as MLA for first time from  Khairatabad Assembly constituency by defeating Ex-Minister Danam Nagender of Indian National Congress.

References

Living people
People from Telangana
Telangana politicians
Bharatiya Janata Party politicians from Telangana
Telugu politicians
Telangana MLAs 2014–2018
Year of birth missing (living people)